Baisha Subdistrict is a subdistrict in Sanyuan District, Sanming, Fujian, China. , it has 7 residential communities under its administration.

See also 
 List of township-level divisions of Fujian

References 

Township-level divisions of Fujian
Sanming